Donacaula pallulellus is a moth in the family Crambidae. It was described by William Barnes and James Halliday McDunnough in 1912. It is found in North America, where it has been recorded from Alabama, Arizona, California, New York and Texas.

The length of the forewings is 20–30 mm. The forewings are pale yellow, sometimes slightly irrorated (sprinkled) with light-brown scales. The hindwings are yellowish white. Adults have been recorded on wing from June to July and in September.

References

Moths described in 1912
Schoenobiinae